The Wales men's national volleyball team is the national team of Wales. It is governed by Volleyball Wales and takes part in international volleyball competitions.

Current squad
The following 12 players were called up for the European Championships 

Recent call-ups also include:

Wales men's national under-21 volleyball team 
The following players were called up for the 2016 School Games

References

External links
Wales Volleyball Association
FIVB World Rankings

National men's volleyball teams
Men's national sports teams of Wales
Volleyball in Wales
Men's volleyball in Wales